The 2022 European Truck Racing Championship was a motor-racing championship using highly tuned tractor units. It was the 38th year of the championship. An eight-round season was announced on 21 December 2021, with the season beginning on 21 May at the Misano World Circuit Marco Simoncelli and ended on 2 October at the Circuito del Jarama.

Schedule
An eight-round calendar was announced on 21 December 2021. The Slovakia Ring returned to the series schedule after being removed for the previous season. The round at the Nürburgring also returned after the 2021 European floods forced its cancellation the previous year.

Teams and drivers
The full season entry list was released on 27 April. Race-by-race entries will be announced throughout the season.

The following table lists all teams and drivers to compete in the 2022 championship.

Results and Standings

Season Summary

Drivers standings
At each race, points are awarded to the top ten classified finishers using the following structure:

External links
 Official website

References

European Truck Racing Championship seasons
European Truck Racing Championship
European Truck Racing Championship